was a village located in Kiso District, Nagano Prefecture, Japan.

As of 2003, the village had an estimated population of 2052 and a population density of 83.18 persons per km². The total area was 24.67 km².

On February 13, 2005, Yamaguchi, along with the towns of Fukuoka, Sakashita and Tsukechi, and the villages of Hirukawa, Kashimo and Kawaue (all from Ena District, Gifu Prefecture), was merged into the expanded city of Nakatsugawa in Gifu Prefecture and no longer exists as an independent municipality.

References

External links
 Nakatsugawa official website 

Dissolved municipalities of Nagano Prefecture
Populated places disestablished in 2005

2005 disestablishments in Japan